The Haitian ambassador in Taipei is the official representative of the Government in Port-au-Prince to the Government of Taiwan.

List of representatives

References 

 
Taiwan
1980 establishments in Haiti
Haiti